is a Japanese actress.

Partial filmography
 Endless Desire (Hateshinaki yokubo, 1958)
 My Second Brother (Nianchan, 1959)
 Hikaru umi (1963)
 Gate of Flesh (Nikutai no mon, 1964)
 Story of a Prostitute (Shunpu den, 1965)
 Fighting Elegy (Kenka erejii, 1966)
 Ketto (1967)
 Tsumiki no hako (1968)
 Nemuri Kyoshiro 12: Akujo-gari (1969)
 The Vampire Doll (1970)
 Lone Wolf and Cub: Baby Cart at the River Styx (Kozure Ōkami: Sanzu no kawa no ubaguruma, 1972)
 Yamaguchi-gumi San-daime (1973)
 Hissatsu shikakenin baian ari-jigoku (1975)
 Yami no karyudo (1979)
 The Battle of Port Arthur (1980), Empress Shōken
 Shogun Assassin (1980)
 Seiha (1982)
 Kagi (1983)
 Tengoku ni ichiban chikai shima (1984)
 Tsuribaka nisshi 4 (1991)
 Paris Fantasy (Gensō no Paris), 1992)
 Tsuribaka nisshi supesharu (1994)

External links
 
 

1943 births
Living people
People from Tokyo
Japanese actresses